Hermann Benke (1866–1937) was an Austrian stage and film actor. He made a number of appearances in silent films, co-starring with the rising actress Liane Haid in productions by Wiener Kunstfilm.

Selected filmography
 With Heart and Hand for the Fatherland (1915)
 With God for Emperor and Empire (1916)
 On the Heights (1916)
 Summer Idyll (1916)
 The Tragedy of Castle Rottersheim (1916)
 Lebenswogen (1917)
 The Black Hand (1917)
 Rigoletto (1918)
 The Films of Princess Fantoche (1921)
 The Woman in White (1921)
 The Arsonists of Europe (1926)
 Kissing Is No Sin (1926)
 The Woman of Yesterday and Tomorrow (1928)

References

Bibliography
 Grange, William. Cultural Chronicle of the Weimar Republic. Scarecrow Press, 2008.

External links

1866 births
1937 deaths
Austrian male film actors
Austrian male stage actors
Actors from Linz